Spa School Bermondsey is a coeducational special school for pupils aged 11 to 19. It is located in the Bermondsey area of the London Borough of Southwark, England. It is one of Britain's largest state schools for children with autism, and has a high staff to student ratio.

The school occupies an old-fashioned red-brick building behind which is a landscaped garden through which flows an artificial stream.

Students
There are 100 pupils aged between 11 and 19, both boys and girls, with a range of autism spectrum disorders between severe and high-functioning.

Media attention
The school was featured within a BBC article "School grounds 'improve behaviour'" and students and staff alike were interviewed on the school's scheme of natural improvement within the school grounds.

A Channel 4 documentary Make Me Normal, broadcast on 2 June 2005, was filmed at the school.

References

Schools for people on the autistic spectrum
Special secondary schools in England
Special schools in the London Borough of Southwark
Academies in the London Borough of Southwark
Autism-related organisations in the United Kingdom
Educational institutions with year of establishment missing